Surges Bay is a rural locality and body of water in the local government area of Huon Valley in the South-east region of Tasmania. The 2016 census has a population of 127 for the state suburb of Surges Bay.

History
Surges Bay was gazetted as a locality in 1965.

Geography
The shore of the Huon River estuary forms the north-eastern boundary. Surges Bay (the body of water) is an inlet of the Huon River estuary.

Road infrastructure
The A6 route (Huon Highway) enters from the north-east and runs through to the south, where it exits. Route C638 (Esperance Coast Road) starts at an intersection with A6 and runs south-east through the locality until it exits in the south-east.

References

Localities of Huon Valley Council
Towns in Tasmania
Bays of Tasmania